Mogibacterium is a Gram-positive, strictly anaerobic and non-spore-forming bacterial genus from the family of Eubacteriaceae.

References

Further reading 
 

Clostridiaceae
Bacteria genera